Closer to the Sun may refer to:

Closer to the Sun (Slightly Stoopid album), 2005
Closer to the Sun (Guy Sebastian album), 2006

See also
Close to the Sun (disambiguation)